Fred "Rusty" Gage (born October 8, 1950) is the President of the Salk Institute for Biological Studies and the Adler Professor in the Laboratory of Genetics at the Salk Institute, and has concentrated on the adult central nervous system and the unexpected plasticity and adaptability that remains throughout the life of all mammals. His work may lead to methods of replacing brain tissue lost to stroke or Alzheimer's disease and repairing spinal cords damaged by trauma. He was the President-elect of the ISSCR in 2012.

In 1998, Gage (Salk Institute for Biological Studies, La Jolla, California) and Peter Eriksson (Sahlgrenska University Hospital, Gothenburg, Sweden) discovered and announced that the human brain produces new nerve cells in adulthood. Until then, it had been assumed that humans are born with all the brain cells they will ever have.

Gage’s lab showed that, contrary to years of dogma, human beings are capable of growing new nerve cells throughout life. Small populations of immature nerve cells are found in the adult mammalian brain, and Gage is working to understand how these cells can be induced to become mature nerve cells. His team is investigating how such cells can be transplanted back to the brain and spinal cord. They have showed that physical exercise can enhance the growth of new brain cells in the hippocampus, a brain structure that is important for the formation of new memories.  Furthermore, his team is examining the underlying molecular mechanisms that are critical to the birth of new brain cells, work that may lead to new therapeutics for neurodegenerative conditions.

His lab studies the genomic mosaicism that exists in the brain as a result of “jumping genes,” mobile elements, and DNA damage that occurs during development. Specifically, he is interested in how this mosaicism may lead to difference in brain function between individuals. His lab published work showing that Human induced pluripotent stem cells (hiPSCs) erase aging signatures and hiPSC-derived neurons remain rejuvenated, while direct conversion into induced neurons (iNs) preserve donor fibroblast age-dependent transcriptomic signatures.

Education

Gage graduated from St. Stephen's High School in Rome, Italy in 1968 and received his Bachelor of Science degree from the University of Florida and a Ph.D. from Johns Hopkins University. He did his post-doctoral work at Lund University in Sweden, under the direction of cell transplantation pioneer Anders Bjorklund.  He serves as a member of the Science Advisory Board of the Genetics Policy Institute. He also served on the Life Sciences jury for the Infosys Prize in 2015.

Relationship with Phineas Gage
Fred Gage has been said to be a descendant of (or more specifically, the great-grandson of) Phineas Gage, through whose brain an iron bar 1-1/4-inches in diameter was accidentally driven in 1848, transforming him into perhaps the most famous of all brain-injury survivors.  However, this proposition faces considerable difficulties, chief of which being that Phineas Gage had no known children.

Awards and honors

IPSEN Prize in Neuronal Plasticity, 1990
Charles A. Dana Award for Pioneering Achievements in Health and Education, 1993
Christopher Reeve Research Medal, 1997
Max Planck Research Prize, 1999
Metlife Foundation Award for Medical Research in Alzheimer's Disease, 2001
President, Society for Neuroscience, 2001
MetLife Award for Medical Research, 2002
National Academy of Sciences 2003
Keio Medical Science Prize, 2008
Member, American Philosophical Society, 2010

References

https://www.salk.edu/news-release/salk-president-rusty-gage-named-to-new-five-year-term-to-lead-institute/
Salk Institute page
 Rett Syndrome Research Trust
Gage Lab WebSite

1950 births
Living people
American geneticists
Johns Hopkins University alumni
University of Florida alumni
Members of the United States National Academy of Sciences
Members of the American Philosophical Society
Salk Institute for Biological Studies people
Members of the National Academy of Medicine